The Player (Al-laib) is an Algerian television series, produced and broadcast by Télévision Algérienne, directed and written by Djamel Fazaz. It premiere on October, 2004 on Télévision Algérienne, A3 and Canal Algérie.

It stars Mohammed Adjaimi, Fatiha Berber, Samir Abdoun and Asma Djermoune in the main role.

Cast  
 Mohammed Adjaimi as Si Authmane
 Fatiha Berber
 Nawal Zaatar
 Farida Krim
 Nassima
 Samir Abdoun as Reda
 Asma Djermoune as Sabrina
 Abd Al-krim Briber
 Nawal Zmit
 Malika Belbey
 Lamia Bouskin
 Sid Ali Kouiret
 Bahia Rachedi

Series overview

References 

Arabic television series
2004 Algerian television series debuts
2004 Algerian television series endings
2000s Algerian television series
Public Establishment of Television original programming